Lee Hyun-ju (born 7 February 2003) is a South Korean professional footballer who plays as a midfielder for German club Bayern Munich II.

Club career

Early life
Lee started his career with Tree Mers FC in Ansan, before moving to Pohang to join the Pohang Steelers.

Move to Germany
In January 2022, Lee joined German giants Bayern Munich from Pohang Steelers on a year-long loan deal, with the option to make the deal permanent. After impressing with the club's reserve team while on loan, Bayern Munich took up the option to make the deal permanent in August 2022, with Lee signing a deal through 2025.

International career
Lee has represented South Korea at various youth levels. He was called up to the South Korea Olympic team in September 2022, in preparation for the 2024 Summer Olympics.

Personal life
Lee has named Joshua Kimmich as a player he idolises, while also crediting Jamal Musiala as a similarly-aged player he looks up to.

Career statistics

Club

Notes

References

2003 births
Living people
South Korean footballers
South Korea youth international footballers
Association football midfielders
Regionalliga players
Pohang Steelers players
FC Bayern Munich footballers
FC Bayern Munich II players
South Korean expatriate footballers
South Korean expatriate sportspeople in Germany
Expatriate footballers in Germany